The following is a list of Oregon counties and places in order of per capita income.
Oregon has the twenty-third highest per capita income in the United States of America, at $20,940 (2000).  Its personal per capita income is $29,340 (2003).

Counties ranked by per-capita income

Note: Data is from the 2010 United States Census Data and the 2006-2010 American Community Survey 5-Year Estimates.

References

See also
 Lists of Oregon-related topics

Economy of Oregon
 
United States locations by per capita income
Income